Odorrana sinica is a species of frogs in the family Ranidae that is endemic to China.

Its status is insufficiently known as it is only known from the type specimen collected from an unspecific location.

References

sinica
Amphibians described in 1927
Frogs of China
Endemic fauna of China
Taxonomy articles created by Polbot